Dres or DRES may refer to:

Dres (Polish subculture) (plural dresy or dresiarze) is a term used in Poland to describe a subculture of young males.
 Dres, hamlet in Cles, Italy
 Dres (rapper), Andres Titus, a rapper of the alternative hip hop duo Black Sheep 
 Drês, a 2009 album by Nando Reis
 Dres, fictional dwarf planet in the video game Kerbal Space Program

Acronyms
 Defence Research Establishment Suffield, the former name for the military research facility near Suffield, Alberta
 Ukrainian: ДРЕС Thermal power stations in Russia and Soviet Union